The Basilica of Our Lady of El Valle It is a Gothic Revival basilica located in El Valle del Espíritu Santo a town on the island of Margarita, of Nueva Esparta state, in northwestern Venezuela.

Its name is in honor of the patron saint of the town and the Venezuelan Navy: the Virgen del Valle. After being founded the church San Nicolás de Bari, it was declared Basilica of Nueva Esparta state, on September 8, 1955, so that from that date its festivities are held; beginning with the descent of the Virgin on 8 September each year, which is placed where the public can see it up close. On 8 December is the rise of the Virgin, which is placed on an altar located at the top where the priest officiates masses.

Initially a small church, the building has been modified several times.  One of the modifications was coordinated by Father Philip Martinez in 1733. It was declared a Minor Basilica by Pope John Paul II in 1995.

See also
Roman Catholicism in Venezuela
Virgen del Valle

References

Our Lady of El Valle
Buildings and structures in Nueva Esparta
Gothic Revival architecture in Venezuela
Roman Catholic churches completed in 1733
18th-century Roman Catholic church buildings in Venezuela
Margarita Island